Leonard Kinsella (born 14 May 1946) is a Scottish retired professional footballer who played as a midfielder.

References

1946 births
Living people
People from Alexandria, West Dunbartonshire
Footballers from West Dunbartonshire
Scottish footballers
Association football midfielders
Burnley F.C. players
Carlisle United F.C. players
Rochdale A.F.C. players
English Football League players